Jauna Murmu (born 16 August 1990) is an Indian sprint runner and hurdler from Odisha who specializes in 400 metres and 400 metres hurdles. She belongs to Mayurbhanj District of Odisha. She has received coaching from Arun Kumar Das and Subash Chandra Dasmohapatra.
She is presently employed by with ONGC

Achievements
She has multiple International and national achievements.

International
Finished 4th in 400m hurdles in 2010 Asian Games held in Guangzhou, China.
Won one gold medal in women’s 400 metre hurdles event, clocking 57.39 seconds and claimed one bronze in 400 metres sprint with a timing of 53.17 seconds in the 3rd Asian All Star Athletics Meet, which concluded at New Delhi on July 30, 2010.
Two gold medals in the 2016 South Asian Games: in the 400m hurdles and the 4 × 400 m relay.

National
Won the silver medal in women's 400m event of the National Inter-State Senior Athletics Championship, clocking 52.78 seconds at Patiala, Punjab on August 6, 2010.

Doping
Murmu tested positive for the anabolic steroid Methandienone in an out of competition test 25 May 2011 and was subsequently handed a two-year doping ban.

References

1990 births
Living people
Indian female sprinters
21st-century Indian women
21st-century Indian people
Sportswomen from Odisha
Doping cases in athletics
Indian sportspeople in doping cases
People from Mayurbhanj district
Santali people
Athletes (track and field) at the 2010 Asian Games
Athletes (track and field) at the 2018 Asian Games
Commonwealth Games medallists in athletics
Commonwealth Games gold medallists for India
Athletes from Odisha
Athletes (track and field) at the 2010 Commonwealth Games
South Asian Games gold medalists for India
Asian Games competitors for India
South Asian Games medalists in athletics
Medallists at the 2010 Commonwealth Games